Hover is a domain name registrar based in Toronto, Ontario, Canada. They offer domain name and email services. They currently have over 300 Top-level domains (TLDs) and also offers users email mailboxes or just email forwarding.

History 
Hover was founded in December 2008 by Tucows Inc. after deciding to merge the three domain registration services they already owned, NetIdentity, It's Your Domain (IYD), and Domain Direct.

Business 
Hover is using the Tucows wholesale reseller services provided by OpenSRS as its foundation.

See also 
 List of domain registrars
 Domain name
 Tucows

References

External links 
 

Canadian companies established in 2008
Companies based in Toronto
Domain name registrars
Tucows
Internet properties established in 2008
2008 establishments in Ontario